Ocoyoacac is a municipality in the State of Mexico in Mexico. The municipal seat is the town of Ocoyoacac.  The municipality covers an area of  134.71 km². It is one of the 17 municipalities that border Mexico City. It borders the Distrito Federal's western borough of Cuajimalpa.

As of the 2010 census, the municipality had a total population of 61,805 inhabitants.

Towns and Villages

The largest localities (cities, towns, and villages) are:

See also
La Marquesa National Park

References

External links

 
Populated places in the State of Mexico
Otomi settlements